Mayflower Secondary School is a co-educational government secondary school in Ang Mo Kio, Singapore founded in 1981.

History
Mayflower Secondary School began in 1981 with Wan Hussein as the pioneering principal. On 15 July 1983, the school was officially opened by Lim Boon Heng, Member of Parliament for Kebun Baru.

In 2007 the school embarked on a programme "Project Cool Running" to raise funds to equip the school hall with air-conditioning. This was organised by the Kebun Baru Community Club.

The first event, "Tri-Fit", was carried out on 12 March 2011. This event involved the whole school population, and they participated in one of the three sports events: walking, rollerblading and rope skipping. The school's partners were invited to participate in the afternoon festivities of line dancing, karaoke and waltz dancing.

Principals

Notable alumni
 Paige Chua, actress
 Huang Biren, actress
 Ann Kok, actress

References

External links
 
 Mayflower Secondary School E-Learning portal

Secondary schools in Singapore
Educational institutions established in 1981
Schools in Ang Mo Kio
1981 establishments in Singapore